A True Daughter of the Party is a North Korean revolutionary opera. First performed in 1971, it is credited to Kim Jong-il.

The opera is considered one of the "Five Great Revolutionary Operas", a group of classical, revolution-themed opera repertoires well received within North Korea. A True Daughter of the Party is the only one of the five set during the Korean War.

It is performed with a male chorus, a smaller female chorus, with Western musical instruments, principally brass and strings.

Plot

During the Korean War, Kang Yong-ok serves in the Taebaek Mountains as a nurse for injured Korean People's Army soldiers as they fight against the American forces.

Reception
The main theme, "Where Are You, Dear General?", is a paean to Kim Il-sung, credited to Kim Jong-il as composer; it was added to the opera by Kim Jong-il after he noted that A True Daughter of the Party was unpopular and that "the reason for its failure was that loyalty to the great leader was not brought into bold relief and that there was no suitable theme song."

See also

List of North Korean operas
Culture of North Korea
North Korean literature
Korean War
Korean People's Army

References

External links

1971 operas
Korean-language operas
Opera in North Korea
Operas set in the 20th century
Cultural depictions of nurses
Films about the Korean People's Army
Korean War in popular culture